Sir George Edwards OBE (5 October 1850 – 6 December 1933) was a trade unionist and Labour Party politician in the United Kingdom.

Early life and career 
Edwards was born in Marsham, Norfolk, the son of a poor ex-soldier who worked as an agricultural labourer. After the Crimean War, when the family's income was threatened by rising prices, they had to enter the workhouse for a year. At the age of 6, Edwards went to work for one shilling (five pence) a week, scaring crows. Because of the need to work he never went to school, and only learnt to read and write in adult life, being taught by his wife.

He joined the Primitive Methodists, and married at the age of 22. In 1889 he became secretary of the Norfolk and Norwich Amalgamated Labour Union, which ceased to exist in 1896.

Ten years later (1906) he founded the Eastern Counties Agricultural Labourers & Small Holders Union later known as the National Union of Agricultural and Allied Workers, and became its general secretary. He cycled over 6,000 miles to meetings in the first year, and built its membership to over 3,000.

Political career 
In 1906 he was elected to Norfolk County Council, in 1914 he became a magistrate, and in 1918 he became a county alderman. During the war he served on various committees and was given the OBE.

He contested the South Norfolk constituency at the 1918 general election. He won 26% of the votes, losing to the Liberal Party candidate William Cozens-Hardy.

When Cozens-Hardy succeeded to the peerage in 1920 as Baron Cozens-Hardy, Edwards won the resulting by-election in July 1920, with 46% of the votes, with Liberal vote split between pro- and anti-coalition candidates.  Edwards was then nearly 70 years of age, one of the oldest ever by-election winners. At the 1922 general election, the Liberals did not field a candidate, and he lost the seat to the Conservative Thomas William Hay.

Edwards was returned to the House of Commons at the 1923 general election, when he beat Hay with a majority of only 861 votes, but lost again in 1924, to the Conservative James Christie. He did not stand for Parliament again.

He was knighted in 1930. His wife died in 1912, and they had no children.

See also 
 1920 South Norfolk by-election

Publications 
   See it in Project Gutenberg.

References 
 
 
 Obituary, The Times, 7 December 1933

External links 
 
 How the farmworkers got organised (The Socialist Party)
 Century-old pay struggle for 'brother to the ox' (The Scotsman)
 Start of the new norfolk union (EASF website)
 
 

1850 births
1933 deaths
General Secretaries of the National Union of Agricultural and Allied Workers
People from Broadland (district)
Officers of the Order of the British Empire
Labour Party (UK) MPs for English constituencies
Members of Norfolk County Council
Members of the Parliamentary Committee of the Trades Union Congress
National Union of Agricultural and Allied Workers-sponsored MPs
UK MPs 1918–1922
UK MPs 1923–1924
Knights Bachelor
Councillors in Norfolk